Alexandra Maria Lara (née Plătăreanu; 12 November 1978) is a Romanian-German actress who has appeared in Downfall (2004), Control (2007), Youth Without Youth (2007), The Reader (2008), Rush (2013), and Geostorm (2017).

Early life
Born in Bucharest, Lara is the only child of Valentin Plătăreanu, an actor, and his wife, Doina. In 1983, her family fled to West Germany to escape Nicolae Ceaușescu's regime in Communist Romania. Although the family had planned to emigrate to Canada, they settled in Freiburg im Breisgau, before eventually moving to Berlin.

Career
By sixteen, she was playing lead roles in various television dramas; since then, she has appeared in films, including as Traudl Junge, Adolf Hitler's secretary, in the Academy Award-nominated 2004 film Downfall; following this, Francis Ford Coppola wrote her a letter and gave her a leading role in Youth Without Youth (2007).

In 2007 she also appeared as Belgian journalist Annik Honoré in the film Control, the Ian Curtis biopic. In 2008, she served as a member of the Cannes Film Festival jury. She has also appeared in several French productions, including Napoléon and L'Affaire Farewell. She appeared in The Reader and Der Baader Meinhof Komplex which were both nominated for the 81st Academy Awards, for best picture and best foreign language film, respectively.

In 2018 she starred with her real life husband Sam Riley in Happy New Year, Colin Burstead by Ben Wheatley, playing his German girlfriend.

Personal life

In August 2009, Lara married English actor Sam Riley, with whom she acted in the films Control and Suite Française. In January 2014, she gave birth to their first child, a boy. They also played a couple on-screen in Ben Wheatley's drama Happy New Year, Colin Burstead.

Filmography

Stella Stellaris (1994, TV miniseries) 
I Desire You (1995), as Mädchen am Bahnhof
Mensch, Pia! (1996, TV series, 10 episodes, breakthrough role), as Pia Mangold
: Tote weinen nicht (1997, TV series episode), as Laura
Das Vorsprechen (1997, Short), as Junge Schauspielerin
Die Mädchenfalle – Der Tod kommt online (1998, TV film), as Silke Hartmann
Tatort: Fürstenschüler (1998, TV series episode), as Kerstin
 (1998, TV film), as Renate - jung
Polizeiruf 110: Sumpf (1999, TV series episode), as Meike
Sperling (Sperling und der falsche Freund) (1999, TV series episode)
Our Island in the South Pacific (1999), as Sandra
Vertrauen ist alles (2000, TV film), as Jennifer Blankenburg
Lady Cop (ep. Die Geliebte des Killers) (2000, TV series episode), as Sabine Sasse
Fisimatenten (2000), as Hanna
Crazy (2000), as Melanie
Luftpiraten – 113 Passagiere in Todesangst (2000, TV film), as Nicolette
The Tunnel (2001, TV film), as Charlotte 'Lotte' Lohmann
Honolulu (2001), as Cleonise
99 Euro Films (2001) (segment "Privat")
Leo & Claire (2001), as Käthe Katzenberger
Liebe und Verrat (2002, TV film), as Marie Irimia
If It Don't Fit, Use a Bigger Hammer (2002), as Astrid
Schleudertrauma (2002, TV film), as Doreen
Naked (2002), as Annette
Napoléon (2002, TV miniseries), as Comtesse Marie Walewska
Doctor Zhivago (2002, TV miniseries), as Tonya Gromyko Zhivago
 (2002, TV film), as Princess Amélie (Anna Amalia)
 (2004, TV miniseries), as Camilla Senger, geb. Hofmann
Leise Krieger (2004, Short), as Nora
Downfall (2004, directed by Oliver Hirschbiegel), as Traudl Junge
Cowgirl (2004), as Johanna 'Paula' Jakobi / Murderous Lady im Film Noir
 (2005), as Venus Morgenstern
 (2005), as Ida
Offset (2006), as Brindusa Herghelegiu
Where Is Fred? (2006), as Denise Poppnick
The Company (2007, TV miniseries), as Lili
Control (2007, directed by Anton Corbijn), as Annik Honore
I Really Hate My Job (2007), as Suzie
Youth Without Youth (2007, directed by Francis Ford Coppola), as Veronica / Laura / Rupini
Miracle at St. Anna (2008, directed by Spike Lee), as Axis Sally
The Baader Meinhof Complex (2008, directed by Uli Edel), as Petra Schelm
The Reader (2008, directed by Stephen Daldry), as Young Ilana Mather
 (2009), as Juliana Lukas
The City of Your Final Destination (2009, directed by James Ivory), as Deirdre Rothemund
Farewell (2009), as Jessica
City of Life (2009), as Natalia Moldovan
The Nazi Officer's Wife (2010)
A Distant Neighborhood (2010, directed by Sam Garbarski), as Anna Verniaz
Small World (2010), as Simone Senn
 (2011, directed by Detlev Buck), as Sarah
Nachtlärm (2012), as Livia
Imagine (2012, directed by Andrzej Jakimowski), as Eva
Move On (2012), as LenaRush (2013, directed by Ron Howard), as Marlene LaudaSuite Française (2015, directed by Saul Dibb), as LeahThe Most Beautiful Day (2016), as MonaRobbi, Tobbi und das Fliewatüüt (2016), as Sharon SchalldämpferSing (2016, directed by Garth Jennings), as Rosita (German dubbing, originally performed by Reese Witherspoon)Vier gegen die Bank (2016, directed by Wolfgang Petersen), as FreddieGeostorm (2017, directed by Dean Devlin), as Ute Fassbinder25 km/h (2018, directed by Marcus Goller), as Ingrid (2018), as Antonia BergerHappy New Year, Colin Burstead (2018, directed by Ben Wheatley), as HannahThe Collini Case (2019, directed by Marco Kreuzpaintner), as JohannaBørning 3: Asphalt Burning (2020), as RobinThe King's Man (2021, directed by Matthew Vaughn), as Emily OxfordThe Sitting Duck'' (2022, directed by Jean-Paul Salomé), as Julie

References

External links

  
 
 2005 interview on cineastentreff.de 

1978 births
21st-century German actresses
Actresses from Bucharest
Französisches Gymnasium Berlin alumni
German film actresses
Living people
Romanian emigrants to Germany
Romanian film actresses
21st-century Romanian actresses